The Fathabad Garden (Persian: باغ فتح آباد) is a historical garden in Ekhtiarabad, Kerman Province, Iran. It was built during Qajar era in Ekhtiarabad, 25 kilometers away from the city of Kerman.

Fathabad Castle is a structure nearby.

History and description 
The garden was created in 1876 and with an area of 13 hectares by Fazlali Khan Biglarbeigi who was the governor of Kerman at the time. The garden includes a two-story mansion at the northern end of the garden. The building with arches on both sides and three-door and five-door rooms in the middle has a unique architecture of the European-Iranian style that has modeled the historical Shazdeh Garden in Mahan.

It was listed among the national heritage sites of Iran with the number 7284 on 1 February 2003.

References 

Buildings and structures in Kerman Province
Tourist attractions in Kerman Province
National works of Iran
Qajar Iran